The 1995 Girabola was the 17th season of top-tier football competition in Angola. Atlético Petróleos de Luanda were the defending champions.

The league comprised 14 teams, the bottom four of which were relegated.

Petro de Luanda were crowned champions, winning their 10th title, and third in a row, while FC de Cabinda, Sonangol do Namibe, Sporting de Luanda and Sporting do Lubango were relegated.

Serginho of Desportivo da EKA finished as the top scorer with 19 goals.

Changes from the 1994 season
Relegated: Inter da Huíla, Sagrada Esperança
Promoted: Académica do Lobito, FC de Cabinda, Petro do Huambo, Sporting do Lubango

League table

Results

Season statistics

Top scorer
 Serginho

Champions

References

External links
Federação Angolana de Futebol

Girabola seasons
Angola
Angola